The men's 100 metres event at the 2007 Summer Universiade was held on 10–12 August. The final originally took place on 11 August but the results were cancelled due to a marginal false-start by Simeon Williamson, which was not at first noticed by the officials. A re-run was ordered a day later. The order of medalists, however, stayed the same after the second race.

Medalists

Results

Heats
Qualification: First 3 of each heat (Q) and the next 8 fastest (q) qualified for the quarterfinals.

Wind:Heat 1: -0.3 m/s, Heat 2: -0.6 m/s, Heat 3: -0.7 m/s, Heat 4: -0.6 m/sHeat 5: -0.9 m/s, Heat 6: -0.6 m/s, Heat 7: -2.9 m/s, Heat 8: -3.0 m/s

Quarterfinals
Qualification: First 4 of each heat qualified directly (Q) for the semifinals.

Wind:Heat 1: -0.8 m/s, Heat 2: -0.6 m/s, Heat 3: -0.9 m/s, Heat 4: -0.6 m/s

Semifinals
Wind:Heat 1: -2.0 m/s, Heat 2: -3.8 m/s
Qualification: First 4 of each semifinal qualified directly (Q) for the final.

Final
Wind: -0.9 m/s

References

Results

100
2007